Spurilla is a genus of sea slugs, aeolid nudibranchs, marine gastropod mollusks in the family Aeolidiidae.

Species
Species within the genus Spurilla include:
 Spurilla braziliana MacFarland, 1909
 Spurilla croisicensis (Labbé, 1923)
 Spurilla dupontae Carmona, Lei, Pola, Gosliner, Valdés & Cervera, 2014
 Spurilla neapolitana (delle Chiaje, 1844) - type species of the genus
 Spurilla sargassicola Bergh, 1861

Species brought into synonymy
 Spurilla alba (Risbec, 1928): synonym of Aeolidiella alba Risbec, 1928
 Spurilla australis Rudman, 1982: synonym of Baeolidia australis (Rudman, 1982)
 Spurilla caerulescens (Laurillard, 1830):synonym of Berghia coerulescens (Laurillard, 1830)
 Spurilla chromosoma Cockerell & Eliot, 1905: synonym of Anteaeolidiella chromosoma (Cockerell & Eliot, 1905)
 Spurilla creutzbergi Er. Marcus & Ev. Marcus, 1970: synonym of Berghia creutzbergi Er. Marcus & Ev. Marcus, 1970
 Spurilla faustina (Bergh, 1900): synonym of Baeolidia faustina (Bergh, 1900)
 Spurilla macleayi (Angas, 1864): synonym of Baeolidia macleayi (Angas, 1864)
 Spurilla major (Eliot, 1903): synonym of Baeolidia moebii Bergh, 1888
 Spurilla onubensis Carmona, Lei, Pola, Gosliner, Valdés & Cervera, 2014: synonym of Spurilla croisicensis (Labbé, 1923)
 Spurilla orientalis Bergh, 1905: synonym of Baeolidia orientalis Bergh, 1905
 Spurilla salaamica Rudman, 1982: synonym of Baeolidia salaamica (Rudman, 1982)
 Spurilla vayssierei Garcia J.C. & Cervera, 1985: synonym of Spurilla neapolitana (Delle Chiaje, 1841)
 Spurilla verrucicornis (A. Costa, 1867): synonym of Berghia verrucicornis (A. Costa, 1867)

References

 Rolán E., (2005). Malacological Fauna From The Cape Verde Archipelago. Part 1, Polyplacophora and Gastropoda. ConchBooks, Germany, 456 pages

External links 
 Bergh R. (1864). Anatomiske bidrag til kundskab om Aeolidierne. Det Kongelige Videnskabernes Selskabs Skrifter, Naturvidenskabelige og Mathematiske Afdeling, 7: 139–316.

Aeolidiidae